Mampathy is a small village in between Santhipuram and Koothrapally, or between Santhipuram and Karukachal. Nearest colonies are Kizhuvattu colony, Inchakuzhiyil colony and Kuttickal colony.

Demographics
Over 100 families staying here in this area. This area comes around 1 km diameter. Accessibility wise you can reach here from Karukachal or Koothrappally or Thiruvalla. There is a bus running. through Mampathy, connecting all these places.

History
In the early 19th century, this place was completely forest, and belonged to two three families. Over years all kind of people migrated to this place and now over 100 families are staying in this small area. Initially this area was populated with Hindu Nair castes, but now its equally balanced with all kinds of castes and religions except Muslims.

Schools
Nearest schools are:
Panayampala govt school
Koothrappally st mary's school.

Transportation
Nearest Railway Stations are:

 Changanacherry
 Kottayam
Nearest colleges & Educational institute 
 GURU college Of Nursing
 Elite Tuition Center, Karukachal

Surnames 
Thakidiyel
Kunnel
Thaipral
Thekku porathu
Vadakku porathu
Malayil
Pediekkal
Kizhuvattu
Thengolil
Mozhikkal
Chackungal
Thottacherry House

References

Villages in Kottayam district